The Articles for the Government of the United States Navy were the military laws of the United States Navy for much of its early history.  The Articles were often referred to informally as "Rocks and Shoals", after the language of Article 4, Section 10:

The Articles were replaced by the Uniform Code of Military Justice in 1951.

In popular culture
Rocks and Shoals plays a major part in the first quarter of the Tom Clancy novel Clear and Present Danger, when the captain of a U.S. Coast Guard cutter decides to try a pair of pirates under its rules for rape and murder.

External links
 Articles for the Government of the United States Navy ca. 1930
 Brief discussion of the Articles by Captain Donald I. Thomas, USN (Ret.)

United States federal defense and national security legislation
History of the United States Navy
United States military law
Legal history of the United States